Gattyana is a genus of marine annelids in the family Polynoidae (scale worms). The genus includes 11 species, 9 of which occur in the northern hemisphere, the remaining two are from the Indian Ocean off Mozambique and the Southern Ocean off New Zealand. Species of Gattyana are known from shallow water down to depths of about 1200 m.

Description
Species of Gattyana are short-bodied scale worms with about 34 to 40 segments and 15 pairs of elytra which cover the dorsum completely and have a marginal fringe of papillae. The prostomium is bilobed anteriorly and a pair of cephalic peaks is present. The lateral antennae are inserted ventrally directly beneath the median antenna. The neuropodial lobe is elongate and tapering. Notochaetae of two kinds are present: with capillary tips and with blunt tips. All neurochaetae have unidentate tips.

Species
As at October 2020, Gattyana includes 11 species:
Gattyana amondseni (Malmgren, 1867)
Gattyana australis Averincev, 1978
Gattyana brunnea Hartman, 1966
Gattyana ciliata Moore, 1902
Gattyana cirrhosa (Pallas, 1766)
Gattyana fauveli Misra, 1999
Gattyana mossambica Day, 1962
Gattyana nutti Pettibone, 1955
Gattyana pacifica (Johnson, 1901)
Gattyana pohaiensis Uschakov & Wu, 1959
Gattyana treadwelli Pettibone, 1949

References

Phyllodocida